Oregon Route 281 is an Oregon state highway running from Hood River to the community of Mount Hood. OR 281 is known as the Hood River Highway No. 281 (see Oregon highways and routes).

OR 281 was established in 2002 as part of Oregon's project to assign route numbers to highways that previously were not assigned.

Route description 

OR 281 begins at an intersection with US 30 and OR 35 at Hood River and heads south, intersecting OR 282 five miles (8 km) south of Hood River.  OR 281 continues south through Winans, Dee, and Trout Creek to Parkdale.  At Parkdale, OR 281 turns northeast for two miles (3 km) to the community of Mount Hood, where it ends at an intersection with OR 35. OR 281 is also known as Dee Highway as residents that live along the highway have the name as part of their mailing address.

History 

OR 281 was assigned to the Hood River Highway in 2002.

Major intersections

References 
 Oregon Department of Transportation, Descriptions of US and Oregon Routes, https://web.archive.org/web/20051102084300/http://www.oregon.gov/ODOT/HWY/TRAFFIC/TEOS_Publications/PDF/Descriptions_of_US_and_Oregon_Routes.pdf, page 29.
 Oregon Department of Transportation, Hood River Highway No. 281, ftp://ftp.odot.state.or.us/tdb/trandata/maps/slchart_pdfs_1980_to_2002/Hwy281_1999.pdf

281
Transportation in Hood River County, Oregon